

323001–323100 

|-bgcolor=#f2f2f2
| colspan=4 align=center | 
|}

323101–323200 

|-bgcolor=#f2f2f2
| colspan=4 align=center | 
|}

323201–323300 

|-bgcolor=#f2f2f2
| colspan=4 align=center | 
|}

323301–323400 

|-bgcolor=#f2f2f2
| colspan=4 align=center | 
|}

323401–323500 

|-bgcolor=#f2f2f2
| colspan=4 align=center | 
|}

323501–323600 

|-id=552
| 323552 Trudybell || 2004 TB || Trudy E. Bell (born 1950) is a prolific science writer and former editor for Scientific American and contract writer and editor for NASA. Among her many awards is the David N. Schramm Award of the American Astronomical Society. || 
|}

323601–323700 

|-bgcolor=#f2f2f2
| colspan=4 align=center | 
|}

323701–323800 

|-bgcolor=#f2f2f2
| colspan=4 align=center | 
|}

323801–323900 

|-bgcolor=#f2f2f2
| colspan=4 align=center | 
|}

323901–324000 

|-bgcolor=#f2f2f2
| colspan=4 align=center | 
|}

References 

323001-324000